Dhu al-Qa'dah, also spelled Dhu al-Qi'dah or Zu al-Qa'dah, is the eleventh month in the Islamic calendar.

It could possibly mean "possessor or owner of the sitting and seating place" - the space occupied while sitting or the manner of the sitting, pose or posture.

It is one of the four sacred months in Islam during which warfare is prohibited, hence the name "Master of Truces".

In Ottoman times, the name in Ottoman Turkish was Zi'l-ka'dé, abbreviation Za. In modern Turkish, it is Zilkade.

Transliteration
The most correct and most traditionally widespread transliteration of the month according to the thirteenth century Syrian jurist al-Nawawi is Dhu'l Qa'dah. Al-Nawawi also mentions that a smaller group of linguists allow the transliteration Dhu'l-Qi'dah, however. In modern times, it is most commonly referred to as Dhu'l Qi'dah although this is neither linguistically nor historically the strongest position.

Timing 

The Islamic calendar is a lunar calendar, and months begin when the first crescent of a new moon is sighted.  Since the Islamic lunar calendar year is 11 to 12 days shorter than the tropical year, Dhu'l-Qi'dah migrates throughout the seasons. The estimated start and end dates for Dhu'l-Qi'dah, based on the Umm al-Qura calendar of Saudi Arabia, are:

Islamic events 

 5 AH, the Muslims took part in the Battle of the Trench.
 6 AH, Truce of Hudaubiyah.
 6 AH, Pledge of the Tree.
 7 AH, The first pilgrimage - the return to Mecca for the performance of Umrah by Muhammad and his companions.
 1 Dhu'l-Qi'dah, birth anniversary of Fātimah bint Mūsā.
 1 Dhu'l-Qi'dah, Treaty of Hudaybiyyah.
 8 Dhu'l-Qi'dah, Hajj was made incumbent upon Muslims in 8 AH.
 11 Dhu'l-Qi'dah, birth anniversary of Imam Ali ibn Musa al-Ridha, the eighth Twelver Imam .
 23 Dhu'l-Qi'dah, martyrdom of Imam Ali al-Ridha according to one tradition.
 25 Dhu'l-Qi'dah, the day earth was laid beneath the Ka'ba, and the birth date of Ibrahim and Jesus.
 29 Dhu'l-Qi'dah, martyrdom of Imam Muhammad ibn Ali at-Taqi al-Jawad, the ninth Twelver Imam.

References

External links 

 Islamic-Western Calendar Converter (Based on the Arithmetical or Tabular Calendar)

92
Islamic terminology

sv:Dhu-l-Qa'dah